Allner See is an artificial lake near Hennef in Rhein-Sieg-Kreis, North Rhine-Westphalia, Germany. At an elevation of 63,5 m, its surface area is 0.10 km². Directly to the north is the 15th century castle Schloss Allner.

Starting in 1979 excavations to obtain sand and gravel for the construction of Highway 560 created a pit some six meters below the water table. In 1986 it was decided by the Hennef town administration to create a lake, and embankments and protection strips were built. In 1990 trees were planted and landscaping was finished just as the highway was completed, producing the lake in its current form. The lake has been stocked with fish for anglers, but swimming and water sports are prohibited.

References 

Lakes of North Rhine-Westphalia
RAllnerSee